Srđan Grujičić (born 19 July 1987) is a Serbian football midfielder who plays for Strelac Mislođin.

References

External links
 
 Srđan Grujičić stats at utakmica.rs

1987 births
Living people
Footballers from Belgrade
Association football midfielders
Serbian footballers
FK Radnički Obrenovac players
FK Radnički 1923 players
FK Jedinstvo Užice players
FK Čukarički players
FK Kolubara players
FK Donji Srem players
FK Sloboda Užice players
Serbian SuperLiga players